Abraxas degener is a species of moth belonging to the family Geometridae. It was described by Warren in 1894.

References

Abraxini
Moths described in 1894